The A886 road in Scotland is an unusual road in the United Kingdom, located in the south of Argyll and Bute, on the Cowal peninsula and on the Isle of Bute.  It has been wrongly described as the only road number to include a ferry crossing along the route - in fact the A884 also includes the crossing between Lochaline and Fishnish, on Mull. The Caledonian MacBrayne ferry service runs between Colintraive in Cowal, on the mainland, and Rhubodach on the Isle of Bute.

References

External links
 SABRE page

A886 road
A886 road
8-0886